Malua was the most versatile Australian thoroughbred racehorse in history. Malua won over distances ranging from  furlongs to  miles (1,100 – 5,200 metres).

Breeding
He was a son of St. Albans (GB) from Edella by Peter Wilkins (GB). Malua was bred by John Field of "Calstock" in Deloraine, Tasmania, and as a yearling was sold to Thomas Reibey the former Premier of Tasmania.

Racing record
As a two-year-old the colt raced in Tasmania, where his name was Bagot. He won on three different tracks, but was then sold on the mainland for 500 guineas to J.O. Inglis, who changed the colt's name to Malua.

In 1884, Malua won the Newmarket Handicap and Oakleigh Plate carrying .  Malua's jockey set a precedent when he took him to the outside (grandstand side) rail to win the Newmarket, a tactic not used before. The term "Malua's track" was coined to name that portion of the Flemington Racecourse.

After a trip to Sydney, where he won the Spring Stakes, Malua returned to Melbourne for the 1884 Caulfield Cup, in which he carried . He was not placed but finished strongly and convinced his connections to run him in the Melbourne Cup. He won the Melbourne Stakes and became favourite for the big race. Carrying , Malua fought out the finish with Commotion (9 st 12 lb) to win by half a length. Two days later he won the six-furlong weight-for-age Flying Stakes on Oaks Day.

Malua had a marvellous constitution and in 1886 carried 9st 9 lb to win the Australian Cup. In 1888 he was switched to jumping, not so unusual in those days and he won the VRC Grand National Hurdle, ridden by his owner, J.O.Inglis. Malua continued racing combining it with his stud career until 1889.

This was an extraordinary horse that was able to carry heavy weights and defeat the best racehorses in top sprint and staying races.

Stud record
Despite his vigorous career, Malua sired 9 stakeswinners with 13 stakeswins including Malvolio, (1891 Melbourne Cup), Mora (VRC Melbourne Stakes, SAJC Adelaide Cup and VRC October Stakes) and Ingliston (1900 Caulfield Cup).

Honours
Malua was inducted into the Australian Racing Hall of Fame in 2003. In the suburb of Ormond in Melbourne, there is a street named after the great horse (Malua Street).  This little street also for a period of time housed the great Dame Nellie Melba. A memorial to Malua was erected and opened in October 2009 in the Deloraine Museum, in the town where he was born.

References

The Mighty Malua

External links
 Australian Racing Museum and Hall of Fame
 Malua's pedigree and stats

Australian Racing Hall of Fame horses
Racehorses bred in Australia
Racehorses trained in Australia
Melbourne Cup winners
Thoroughbred family 3-a
1879 racehorse births
1896 racehorse deaths